Dual education may refer to:

 Dual education system
 Dual-sector education